The following page lists the highest-grossing horror films, highest-grossing horror film franchises at the box office and the biggest opening weekends for many horror films. The figures have not been adjusted for inflation.

Highest-grossing horror films

Highest-grossing horror film franchises and film series

Highest-grossing horror films by year

Timeline of highest-grossing horror films

By tickets sold
The following is a list of horror films which sold more than 1 million tickets.

See also
 Lists of highest-grossing films
 List of highest-grossing R-rated films
 List of highest-grossing media franchises

Notes

References

External links
 Top 25 Highest Grossing Horror Movies Worldwide at IMDb

Lists of horror films
Horror